Kristaps Grebis (born 13 December 1980 in Liepāja) is a retired Latvian footballer.

Club career
Grebis started his professional career in 2000 with FK Liepājas Metalurgs. Making 7 appearances and scoring one goal in his first season, he later had a short spell with FK Rīga, returning to Liepāja in 2002. This time playing there for 4 straight years, in 2006 he left for Oxford United. Grebis had his contract with Oxford United cancelled by mutual consent in March 2007, as this period of his career wasn't the best. Later on he joined FK Ventspils, but in 2008 came back to his home land team Liepājas Metalurgs. He played there for two years, until 2008, making 63 appearances and scoring 48 goals. In 2009, he was the best scorer of the Virsliga championship with 30 goals in one season. This was definitely the best period in his career, while playing in Latvia. In February 2011 he joined AEL Limassol, after being on trial with them for 2 weeks. His stay in Cyprus didn't last for long, as the club decided to release him just 4 days after joining, pointing that Grebis had been diagnosed heart problems in the medical tests. Later on it was said that there were no problems with Grebis's heart, but the club had needed to find a reason to release Grebis, as the new coach hadn't wanted to keep him in the squad. A week later he signed a contract with FK Gence, playing in the Azerbaijan Premier League. In July 2011 Grebis moved to FK Simurq Zaqatala. In August 2012 he was signed by the German NOFV-Oberliga Nord club Viktoria 1889. He left the club in February 2013, having played 5 league matches, and returned to the Latvian Higher League, signing with Daugava Rīga. Grebis played 9 matches for Daugava, marking 1 goal to his name, before joining FC Jūrmala in July 2013. Prior to the 2014 season Grebis returned to his home-town Liepāja and signed a contract with the newly established club FK Liepāja, led by his former international teammate Māris Verpakovskis. He scored on his debut for the club.

Grebis retired after the 2018 season.

International career
Grebis made his debut for Latvia in 2008. He has collected 13 appearances and scored 2 international goals.

Honours
 Latvian Higher League champion (3): 2005, 2007, 2009
 Latvian Football Cup winner (2): 2006, 2007
 Baltic League champion (1): 2007

References

External links
 
 
 

1980 births
Living people
Sportspeople from Liepāja
Latvian footballers
Association football forwards
FK Liepājas Metalurgs players
FK Rīga players
Oxford United F.C. players
FK Ventspils players
Simurq PIK players
FK Daugava (2003) players
FC Jūrmala players
FK Liepāja players
Latvian Higher League players
National League (English football) players
Latvian expatriate footballers
Latvia international footballers
Expatriate footballers in England
Latvian expatriate sportspeople in England
Expatriate footballers in Azerbaijan
Latvian expatriate sportspeople in Azerbaijan
Expatriate footballers in Germany
Latvian expatriate sportspeople in Germany